Burgkirchen an der Alz is a municipality in the district of Altötting, in Bavaria, Germany. It is situated on the river Alz, 8 km west of Burghausen.

References

Altötting (district)